The shikimate pathway (shikimic acid pathway) is a seven-step metabolic pathway used by bacteria, archaea, fungi, algae, some protozoans, and plants for the biosynthesis of folates and aromatic amino acids (tryptophan, phenylalanine, and tyrosine). This pathway is not found in animal cells.

The seven enzymes involved in the shikimate pathway are DAHP synthase, 3-dehydroquinate synthase, 3-dehydroquinate dehydratase, shikimate dehydrogenase, shikimate kinase, EPSP synthase, and chorismate synthase. The pathway starts with two substrates, phosphoenol pyruvate and erythrose-4-phosphate, and ends with chorismate, a substrate for the three aromatic amino acids. The fifth enzyme involved is the shikimate kinase, an enzyme that catalyzes the ATP-dependent phosphorylation of shikimate to form shikimate 3-phosphate (shown in the figure below). Shikimate 3-phosphate is then coupled with phosphoenol pyruvate to give 5-enolpyruvylshikimate-3-phosphate via the enzyme 5-enolpyruvylshikimate-3-phosphate (EPSP) synthase.
Glycine phosphonate, more commonly known as Roundup, is a competitive inhibitor of EPSP synthase, acting as a transition state analog that binds more tightly to the EPSPS-S3P complex than PEP and inhibits the shikimate pathway.

Then 5-enolpyruvylshikimate-3-phosphate is transformed into chorismate by a chorismate synthase.

Prephenic acid is then synthesized by a Claisen rearrangement of chorismate by chorismate mutase.

Prephenate is oxidatively decarboxylated with retention of the hydroxyl group to give p-hydroxyphenylpyruvate, which is transaminated using glutamate as the nitrogen source to give tyrosine and α-ketoglutarate.

References

Bibliography 

 
 
 
 

Metabolic pathways